Don King (born 1960) is an American photographer, cinematographer, and film director.  He is renowned worldwide for his  photographic and cinematic images of ocean surface waves and surfing.

Don King was a high school sophomore the first time he sold a photograph.  The purchaser was Surfing magazine, which used it on its cover.

After graduation from Punahou School in 1978,  King attended Stanford University where he majored in psychology, belonged to the Delta Tau Delta fraternity, and was on the Stanford Cardinal water polo team which won the NCAA Men's Water Polo Championships of 1978, 1980 and 1981.  He graduated from Stanford in 1983.

Born and raised in Hawaii, Don King lives on Oʻahu with his wife Julianne Yamamoto King and their sons Beau, Aukai and Dane.

Cinematography
This is a very incomplete list of King's camera and direction credits in film and television.
 1987: North Shore 
 1988: The Tribal Trials   bodyboarding video with Jack Lindholm,  Ben Severson, and Mike Stewart
 1994: The Endless Summer II 
 1995: The Living Sea 
 1997: "Tidal Wave" episode,  Discovery Channel Raging Planet series
 1998: City of Angels 
 1999: Surfing for Life 
 2000: Cast Away 
 2001: "The Big Squish" and "Blue Holes" episodes,  National Geographic Channel The Next Wave series
 2002: Heart of the Sea,  award-winning documentary of the life of surfing champion Rell Sunn.
 2002: Blue Crush 
 2002:  Die Another Day 
 2002: "Condition Black" episode, Nature series
 2003: Step into Liquid 
 2004: Riding Giants 
 2005: "Violent Hawaii" episode, Nature series
 2005: Lords of Dogtown 
 2006: Beautiful Son 
 2008: Forgetting Sarah Marshall  2nd Unit D.P.
 2009: Dear John  water unit D.P.
 2010: Hereafter  water camera operator
 2011: Soul Surfer  2nd unit D.P., B-camera operator
 2011: The Descendants  water camera operator
 2011: Just Go With It  water camera operator
 2011: Pirates of the Caribbean: On Stranger Tides  water camera operator
 2011: Off the Map  water camera operator, B-camera operator
 2012: Battleship water camera operator, C-camera operator
Television
 2003-2010: Lost  camera operator 6 seasons
 2008 Entourage
 2007: Lost episode, season 3 finale "Through the Looking Glass"
Commercials
 American Express "Laird" - Director, Cinematographer
 Cool Water/Davidoff - Director, cinematographer
 Apple - water cinematographer
 Armani - water cinematographer
 Hyundai - water cinematographer
 Coca-Cola - water cinematographer
 Guinness - water cinematographer
 Norwegian Cruise lines - water cinematographer
 Johnson & Johnson - water cinematographer
 Maytag - water cinematographer
 Toyota -water cinematographer
 Weight Watchers -water cinematographer
 E Harmony -water cinematographer
 Kaiser -water cinematographer
 2006: SHISEIDO "TSUBAKI in Japan - water cinematographer
 2011: Nike Commercial water cinematographer
Music VideoMariah Carey Sugarland''

References

American documentary filmmakers
American cinematographers
American film directors
Punahou School alumni
Stanford University alumni
Artists from Hawaii
American surfers
Living people
1960 births